Sir William Gallagher  (18 November 1851 – 5 August 1933) was a British civil servant who served as Chief Inspector of Customs. He was knighted in the 1916 Birthday Honours and appointed Companion of the Order of the Bath (CB) in the 1920 New Year Honours.

Footnotes

1851 births
1933 deaths
Civil servants in HM Customs and Excise
Knights Bachelor
Companions of the Order of the Bath
Companions of the Imperial Service Order